Roy's identity (named after French economist René Roy) is a major result in microeconomics having applications in consumer choice and the theory of the firm.  The lemma relates the ordinary (Marshallian) demand function to the derivatives of the indirect utility function. Specifically, denoting the indirect utility function as  the Marshallian demand function for good  can be calculated as

Derivation of Roy's identity 
Roy's identity reformulates Shephard's lemma in order to get a Marshallian demand function for an individual and a good from some indirect utility function.

The first step is to consider the trivial identity obtained by substituting the expenditure function for wealth or income  in the indirect utility function , at a utility of :

This says that the indirect utility function  evaluated in such a way that minimizes the cost for achieving a certain utility given a set of prices (a vector ) is equal to that utility when evaluated at those prices.

Taking the derivative of both sides of this equation with respect to the price of a single good  (with the utility level held constant) gives:

.

Rearranging gives the desired result:

with the second-to-last equality following from Shephard's lemma and the last equality from a basic property of Hicksian demand.

Alternative proof using the envelope theorem 
For expositional ease, consider the two-goods case. The indirect utility function  is the value function of the constrained optimization problem characterized by the following Lagrangian:

By the envelope theorem, the derivatives of the value function  with respect to the parameters are:

where  is the maximizer (i.e. the Marshallian demand function for good 1). Hence:

Application 
This gives a method of deriving the Marshallian demand function of a good for some consumer from the indirect utility function of that consumer. It is also fundamental in deriving the Slutsky equation.

References 

Consumer theory
Economics theorems